"" ("Let no one know my suffering"), also known as "" ("Love of my loves") is a song originally composed by  that has been recorded by numerous Spanish language artists such as Alberto Castillo, Julio Iglesias and María Dolores Pradera.

Origin
The song "", was composed in 1936 by Ángel Cabral, with (Spanish) lyrics by Enrique Dizeo, both of Argentine origin, as a Peruvian waltz. The song relates the story of a singer breaking off ties with an unfaithful lover, yet ashamed that others might find out about how much the singer is suffering.

La Foule

Almost twenty years after the song's initial South American release, during a Buenos Aires concert tour, Edith Piaf heard it from the 1953 recording by Alberto Castillo. Piaf recorded a French-language version, with lyrics by Michel Rivgauche, which became a hit itself. Subsequently, the original song was a hit once more, under the title "" ("Love of my loves"), the first line of the chorus in the Spanish version.

Michel Rivgauche's lyrics relate the chance meeting between the female singer and a man in the middle of a dense and festive crowd. It is love at first sight, at least on the singer's part, who thanks the crowd for giving her this man. Yet just as quickly as it brought them together, the crowd separates them and she never sees him again. "The crowd acts as a sort of demiurge (creator), like destiny, playing with the human beings who are helpless against the vagaries of chance."

Cover recordings

Que nadie sepa mi sufrir
Alberto Castillo released a version of the song in 1953
 Raphael released a version of the song in 1967
María Dolores Pradera recorded it in 1968
Spanish vocalist Julio Iglesias recorded the song on De niña a mujer in 1981, his first album to be released in the United States
Los Lobos includes a version on their 1988 album La Pistola y El Corazón
François BERTHELOT alias name PACO recorded and in 1988 and was no.1 hit for 5 weeks in France.
La Sonora Dinamita ft. Margarita Vargas recorded a cumbia version on their 1990 album La Tropicalisima (as "Que nadie sepa mi sufrir (Amor de mis amores)")
Cuban group Orquesta Aragón recorded it on their 1997 Cha Cha Charanga album
Sandra Luna, Argentine Tango singer recorded a version on her 2003 album Tango Varón
Chico and the Gypsies - Fiesta (2013, as "Amor de Mis Amores")
Puerto Rican musician José Feliciano covered it with Mexican singer Alicia Villareal on his 2006 release José Feliciano y Amigos. This version peaked at #27 on the Latin Pop Airplay chart)
The Mexican pop/alternative band Hello Seahorse! released a version of the song on the album  Mun Compilado Vol.2 in 2012.
Ecuadorian singer Julio Jaramillo released a version of the song with the name "Que Nadie Sepa Mi Sufrir"

La Foule
French jazz singer Raquel Bitton performed the song as part of her Piaf tribute show "Piaf: Her Story, Her Songs"
Canadian-American Martha Wainwright (daughter of folk singers Kate McGarrigle and Loudon Wainwright III, sister of Rufus Wainwright) covered it on her 2009 Piaf tribute album, Sans Fulils, Ni Souliers, à Paris
Quebec blues/folk singer Bernard Adamus created a stylized version on his 2009 Album Brun
French Chanteuse Mireille Mathieu covered it (as well as other Piaf classics) on her 2012 tribute album Mireille Mathieu chante Piaf
French pop singer Patricia Kaas revisited it on the 2012 album Kaas chante Piaf - deux voix, deux destins, un hommage
Classical Guitarist Jean-Félix Lalanne performed it as a duo with Agnès Jaoui on the 2013 album Une Guitare
Classical composer and guitarist Roland Dyens made an  performed and arrangement for classical guitar in his Chansons francaise album.
British singer Izzy Bizu recorded a cover version with the BBC Concert Orchestra, which was used as the opening theme to the BBC's coverage of UEFA Euro 2016

Other versions
Israeli singer Hava Alberstein recorded the song with Hebrew lyrics, written specially to the music (called "Smiles"; חיוכים in Hebrew), which became very famous

References

External links
 French lyrics with English translation and video clip, at Ooltra.net

Songs about heartache
Édith Piaf songs
1936 songs
Peruvian songs
Spanish-language songs
1957 singles
José Feliciano songs
2006 singles